Sher Garhi Palace is a former palace in Srinagar, Jammu and Kashmir, India. The complex is located in the south of the Old City at the banks of the Jhelum river. It was the residence of the Afghan rulers and Dogra Maharajas of Jammu and Kashmir. The name Sher Garhi means 'tiger fortress'.

History 
Construction of a fortress and palace started in 1772 under the Afghan governor Amir Khan Jawansher. As location the governor chose the (former) site where the Lohara king Ananta built his royal palace in 1062–63. It is said that stones for the construction came from the "Pathar Masjid". Under all Amir Khan Jawansher's successors, both Afghan and Dogra and including the current Indian government, the palace remained the main power center in Kashmir.

During the 19th century, the palace was expanded several times. Around 1900, the Jhelum river front of the palace was reconstructed in neoclassical style with corinthian columns. The complex was a good example of blending English and Kashmir architecture. The buildings in the complex are quadrangular in plan and built entirely in stone with wooden doors, ceilings and roofs.

After the accession of Kashmir to India, the palace obtained the name the "Old Secretariat" and initially housed various administrative departments of the government of Jammu and Kashmir. As chief minister Sheikh Abdullah apparently saw the palace as symbol of Dogra rule, the complex was slowly abandoned. In the 1970s and at the start of the 21st century, the palace was gutted by fire destroying major parts. In 2015, chief minister Mufti Mohammad Sayeed announced that the complex would be restored to its original glory in order to conserve heritage monuments and attract heritage loving tourists to Kashmir.

References

External links 

Royal residences in India
Tourist attractions in Srinagar
Palaces in Jammu and Kashmir
1772 establishments in India
History of Kashmir